The 1990 Mid-Continent Conference men's basketball tournament was held March 5–7, 1990, at the UNI-Dome in Cedar Falls, Iowa. This was the seventh edition of the tournament for the AMCU-8/Mid-Con, now known as the Summit League.

Bracket

References

1989–90 Mid-Continent Conference men's basketball season
Summit League men's basketball tournament
1990 in sports in Iowa